The Stade Municipal La Reole is a rugby ground in La Reole, France. It is currently used by La Reole XIII in the French Elite One Championship The ground currently has a capacity of 2,000. Situated on the waterfront the ground has one stand which seats 100 with the rest of the pitch surrounded by a perimeter fence for standing spectators.

References

Rugby league stadiums in France
Sports venues in Gironde